Cape Foster is a cape lying  southeast of Carlsson Bay on the south side of James Ross Island. It was discovered by a British expedition, 1839–43, under James Clark Ross, who named it for Captain Henry Foster, Royal Navy, leader of a British expedition in the Chanticleer, 1828–31. The cape was mapped by the Swedish Antarctic Expedition under Otto Nordenskiöld, 1901–04.

References 

Headlands of James Ross Island